The men's sprint cycling event at the 1936 Summer Olympics took place on 6 and 7 August and was one of six events at the 1936 Olympics. There were 20 competitors from 20 nations, with each nation limited to one cyclist. The event was won, in a disputed final, by Toni Merkens of Germany, the nation's first medal in the men's sprint. Arie van Vliet took the silver medal, the fifth consecutive Games that a Dutch cyclist had finished in the top two. Louis Chaillot of France became the first man to win multiple medals in the event, adding a bronze to his 1932 silver; it was the fourth consecutive podium appearance for France.

When van Vliet began to overtake Merkens in the first race of the final, Merkens swerved to the right and blatantly interfered with Van Vliet. No penalty was called, and a disconcerted van Vliet lost the second race. The Dutch team protested, but instead of being disqualified, Merkens was fined 100 marks instead.

Background

This was the eighth appearance of the event, which has been held at every Summer Olympics except 1904 and 1912. Two of the semifinalists from 1932 returned: Louis Chaillot of France, who had won the silver medal, and Dunc Gray of Australia, who had not started the bronze medal race but had won the track time trial event. The favorites in 1936, however, were Toni Merkens of Germany and Arie van Vliet of the Netherlands, the winner and runner-up in the 1935 World Championship.

The Republic of China, New Zealand, Norway, and Peru each made their debut in the men's sprint. France made its eighth appearance, the only nation to have competed at every appearance of the event.

Competition format

This track cycling event consisted of numerous rounds. Each race involved the riders starting simultaneously and next to each other, from a standing start. Because the early part of races tend to be slow-paced and highly tactical, only the time for the last 200 metres of the one-kilometre race is recorded.

The competition involved five main rounds and a repechage. In the first round, there were ten heats of two cyclists each. The winner of each heat advanced directly to the second round, while the loser competed in a repechage. The repechage featured four heats, two of three cyclists and two of two cyclists. The last-placed finisher in each repechage was eliminated, while the winner advanced along with the second-place rider in the three-man heats. Round 2 and the quarterfinals were each head-to-head, single-elimination races: eight heats in round 2 and four heats in the quarterfinals. The semifinals were also head-to-head competitions, with the winners advancing to the final and the losers going to a bronze medal match.

The 1932 competition had introduced the best-of-three format for the final (and only the final); the 1936 version expanded that best-of-three format to the bronze medal match as well. The two cyclists in each match competed up to three times, with the first cyclist to win two races being the winner.

Records

The records for the sprint are 200 metre flying time trial records, kept for the qualifying round in later Games as well as for the finish of races.

* World records were not tracked by the UCI until 1954.

No new Olympic record was set during the competition.

Schedule

Results

Round 1

The winner in each heat qualified for the second round. The loser was relegated to the repechage for another chance at qualifying.

Round 1 heat 1

Round 1 heat 2

Round 1 heat 3

Round 1 heat 4

Round 1 heat 5

Round 1 heat 6

Round 1 heat 7

Round 1 heat 8

Round 1 heat 9

Round 1 heat 10

Repechage

The last place finisher in each repechage was eliminated. The winner of each heat advanced to the second round, along with the second place finisher in heats where there were three cyclists.

Repechage heat 1

Repechage heat 2

Repechage heat 3

Repechage heat 4

Round 2

The winner of each heat advanced; the loser was eliminated.

Round 2 heat 1

Round 2 heat 2

Round 2 heat 3

Round 2 heat 4

Round 2 heat 5

Round 2 heat 6

Round 2 heat 7

Round 2 heat 8

Quarterfinals

The winners qualified for the semifinals; the losers were eliminated.

Quarterfinal 1

Quarterfinal 2

Quarterfinal 3

Quarterfinal 4

Semifinals

The semifinal winners advanced to the gold medal final, while the losers competed in the bronze medal final.

Semifinal 1

Semifinal 2

Finals

Both the gold and bronze medal finals were conducted as best-of-three competitions. In each case, the same cyclist won both of the first two races, making a third race unnecessary. Merkens was fined for "deviating from the racing lane" in the first race of the final, though was allowed to finish the competition.

Bronze medal match

Final

References

 1936 Official Report.

Cycling at the 1936 Summer Olympics
Cycling at the Summer Olympics – Men's sprint
Track cycling at the 1936 Summer Olympics